Broadstone is a ward in Poole, Dorset. Since 2019, the ward has elected 2 councillors to Bournemouth, Christchurch and Poole Council, one of which is the former council leader, Vikki Slade.

History 
The ward formerly elected three Councillors to Poole Borough Council.

Geography 
The ward covers the suburb of the same name.

Councillors 
The ward is currently represented by two Liberal Democrat councillors.

Election results

2019

2016 

*On the resignation of Joanne Tomlin

2015

2011

2007

References

External links 

 Listed Buildings in Broadstone Ward, Poole

Poole Borough Council elections
Wards of Bournemouth, Christchurch and Poole